Hills District may refer to:

Places
 Hills District, New South Wales
 Hills District, Queensland

See also
 Hills District Bulls, Rugby league team in Sydney
 Hills District Panthers, Rugby league team in Brisbane
 Hill District (Pittsburgh)